Buckworth is a village in the Huntingdonshire district of Cambridgeshire.

Buckworth may also refer to:

Buckworth, Surrey
John Buckworth (disambiguation)